Biserka Višnjić (born 10 October 1953 in Trogir) is a former Croatian handball player who competed in the 1980 Summer Olympics for the Yugoslavia women's national handball team and in the 1984 Summer Olympics.

In 1980, she won the silver medal with the Yugoslav team. She played all five matches and scored 33 goals. She became the top scorer of the tournament.

Four years later, she won the gold medal as member of the Yugoslav team. She played four matches including the final and scored fifteen goals.

External links
Profile at databaseOlympics.com

1953 births
Living people
Yugoslav female handball players
Croatian female handball players
Handball players at the 1980 Summer Olympics
Handball players at the 1984 Summer Olympics
Olympic handball players of Yugoslavia
Olympic gold medalists for Yugoslavia
Olympic silver medalists for Yugoslavia
Olympic medalists in handball
Medalists at the 1984 Summer Olympics
Medalists at the 1980 Summer Olympics
People from Trogir